Searchable symmetric encryption (SSE) is a form of encryption that allows one to efficiently search over a collection of encrypted documents or files without the ability to decrypt them. SSE can be used to outsource files to an untrusted cloud storage server without ever revealing the files in the clear but while preserving the server's ability to search over them.

Description 
A searchable symmetric encryption scheme is a symmetric-key encryption scheme that encrypts a collection of documents  , where each document  is viewed as a set of keywords from a keyword space . The result of the search is the subset of encrypted documents that contain the keyword .

Static SSE 
A static SSE scheme consists of three algorithms  that work as follows:

  takes as input a security parameter  and a document collection  and outputs a symmetric key , an encrypted index , and an encrypted document collection 
  takes as input the secret key  and a keyword  and outputs a search token 
  takes as input the encrypted index , the encrypted document collection  and a search token  and outputs a set of encrypted documents 
 
A static SSE scheme is used by a client and an untrusted server as follows. The client encrypts its data collection using the  algorithm which returns a secret key  and an encrypted document collection .

Dynamic SSE 
A dynamic SSE scheme supports, in addition to search, the insertion and deletion of documents.
  takes as input the secret key  and a new document  and outputs an insert token  
  takes as input the encrypted document collection EDC and an insert token  and outputs an updated encrypted document collection 
  takes as input the secret key  and a document identifier  and outputs a delete token 
  takes as input the encrypted data collection  and a delete token  and outputs an updated encrypted data collection    

History of Searchable Symmetric Encryption 
The problem of searching on encrypted data was considered by Song, Wagner and Perrig though previous work on Oblivious RAM by Goldreich and Ostrovsky could be used in theory to address the problem. This work proposed an SSE scheme with a search algorithm that runs in time , where . Goh and Chang and Mitzenmacher gave new SSE constructions with search algorithms that run in time , where  is the number of documents. Curtmola, Garay, Kamara and Ostrovsky later proposed two static constructions with  search time, where  is the number of documents that contain , which is optimal. This work also proposed a semi-dynamic construction with  search time, where  is the number of updates. An optimal dynamic SSE construction was later proposed by Kamara, Papamanthou and Roeder.

Goh and Chang and Mitzenmacher proposed security definitions for SSE. These were strengthened and extended by Curtmola, Garay, Kamara and Ostrovsky who proposed the notion of adaptive security for SSE. This work also was the first to observe leakage in SSE and to formally capture it as part of the security definition. Leakage was further formalized and generalized by Chase and Kamara. Islam, Kuzu and Kantarcioglu described the first leakage attack. 

All the previously mentioned constructions support single keyword search. The construction can also be extended to support disjunctive and Boolean searches that can be expressed in searchable normal form (SNF) in sub-linear time. At the same time, Pappas, Krell, Vo, Kolesnikov, Malkin, Choi, George, Keromytis and Bellovin described a construction that supports conjunctive and all disjunctive and Boolean searches in sub-linear time.

Security 
SSE schemes are designed to guarantee that the untrusted server cannot learn any partial information about the documents or the search queries beyond some well-defined and reasonable leakage. The leakage of a scheme is formally described using a leakage profile which itself can consists of several leakage patterns. SSE constructions attempt to minimize leakage while achieving the best possible search efficiency. 

SSE security can be analyzed in several adversarial models but the most common are: 

 the persistent model, where an adversary is given the encrypted data collection and a transcript of all the operations executed on the collection; 
 the snapshot model, where an adversary is only given the encrypted data collection (but possibly after each operation).

Security in the Persistent Model 
In the persistent model, there are SSE schemes that achieve a wide variety of leakage profiles. It is known, however, how to construct schemes that leak considerably less at an additional cost in search time and storage.

When considering dynamic SSE schemes, the state-of-the-art constructions with optimal time search have leakage profiles that guarantee forward privacy which means that inserts cannot be correlated with past search queries.

Security in the Snapshot Model 
In the snapshot model, efficient dynamic SSE schemes with no leakage beyond the number of documents and the size of the collection can be constructed. When using an SSE construction that is secure in the snapshot model one has to carefully consider how the scheme will be deployed because some systems might cache previous search queries.

Cryptanalysis 
A leakage profile only describes the leakage of an SSE scheme but it says nothing about whether that leakage can be exploited or not. Cryptanalysis is therefore used to better understand the real-world security of a leakage profile. There is a wide variety of attacks working in different adversarial models, based on a variety of assumptions and attacking different leakage profiles.

See also 
 Homomorphic encryption
 Oblivious RAM
 Structured encryption
 Deterministic encryption

References 

Cryptographic primitives